Anoplomus cassandra is a species of tephritid or fruit flies in the genus Anoplomus of the family Tephritidae.

References

Tephritinae